The Simón Bolívar Chair in Latin American Studies is a visiting professorship at Cambridge University, funded by  the Venezuelan government. It is awarded to a distinguished Latin American scholar or other intellectual. The position is associated with Cambridge's Centre for Latin American Studies.

Former Simón Bolívar Professors

References

Latin-American Studies, Bolívar, Simón
Latin American studies